James Deshaune Allen (born November 11, 1979) is a former American football linebacker for the New Orleans Saints of the National Football League.

Early life
Allen was born and raised in Portland, Oregon.  He attended Jefferson High School in Portland where he excelled in football. He also was a very skilled saxophone player.

College career
Allen chose to enroll at Oregon State University where he played linebacker under coach Dennis Erickson from 1997 to 2001.  He was an integral member of the 2000 Beaver team that beat Notre Dame 41-9 in the 2001 Fiesta Bowl and finished 4th in the final AP poll.

Professional career

Allen was selected in the 3rd round (82nd overall) in the 2002 NFL Draft by the New Orleans Saints.  He played linebacker for the Saints from 2002 to 2006.

References

1979 births
Living people
American football linebackers
Oregon State Beavers football players
New Orleans Saints players
Jefferson High School (Portland, Oregon) alumni
Players of American football from Portland, Oregon